Nethkin is an unincorporated community in Mineral County, West Virginia, United States. Nethkin lies to the east of Elk Garden.

The community was named after Reese Nethken.

References 

Unincorporated communities in Mineral County, West Virginia
Unincorporated communities in West Virginia